1 Corinthians 3 is the third chapter of the First Epistle to the Corinthians in the New Testament of the Christian Bible. It is authored by Paul the Apostle and Sosthenes in Ephesus, composed between 52–55 CE. In this chapter, Paul begins to deal with the issue of factionalism in the Corinthian church which is one of his main reasons for writing the letter.

Text
The original text was written in Koine Greek. This chapter is divided into 23 verses.

Textual witnesses
Some early manuscripts containing the text of this chapter in Greek are:
Papyrus 46 (AD 175–225)
Codex Vaticanus (325–350)
Codex Sinaiticus (330–360)
Codex Alexandrinus (400–440)
Codex Ephraemi Rescriptus (~450)
Papyrus 14 (6th century; extant verses 8–10, 19–20)
Papyrus 11 (7th century; extant verses 1–3, 5–6)

Old Testament references
 1 Corinthians 3:9 references Isaiah 61:3
 1 Corinthians 3:19 references Job 5:13
 1 Corinthians 3:20 references Psalm 94:11

New Testament references
 1 Corinthians 3:2 references Hebrews 5:12–14

Paul's purpose
Paul's intention in this chapter is to address the spiritual immaturity of the Corinthian church, which is displayed through its intense factionalism.

A similar image is used by the writer of the Epistle to the Hebrews. The Corinthian church appears to be divided into factions supporting or allied with Paul, Apollos and Cephas (1 Corinthians 3:4 and 3:22). "Allegiance to people was obliterating the Gospel for them. Instead of being wise, they were becoming worldly fools".

Verse 16 

"The temple of God": Illustration of the believers as "God's temple" puts Paul as a master builder, with Christ as "the only foundation", in allusion to Solomon's temple, which is seen as "the mystical body of Christ". This correlates to the saying of Jewish sages of the Israelites (F14 R. Alshech in Hag. ii. 5.): , "the temple of the Lord are ye."
"The Spirit of God dwells in you": As a temple is "sacred to deity", so an evidence of the believers being the temple of God is that "the Spirit" should dwell here as 'God, a distinct divine person'.

See also 
Apollos
Temple of Jerusalem
Jesus Christ
 Related Bible parts: Job 5, Psalm 94, 1 Corinthians 6, 2 Corinthians 6

Notes

References

Bibliography

External links 
 King James Bible - Wikisource
English Translation with Parallel Latin Vulgate
Online Bible at GospelHall.org (ESV, KJV, Darby, American Standard Version, Bible in Basic English)
Multiple bible versions at Bible Gateway (NKJV, NIV, NRSV etc.)

03